Lucas Bruera (born 19 October 1997) is an Argentine professional footballer who plays as a goalkeeper for Estudiantes BA.

Club career
Bruera's career began with ADAFI and Estudiantes. Nelson Vivas selected the goalkeeper on the bench versus Rosario Central on 15 October 2016, though he never made a competitive appearance. In January 2017, Bruera moved across the Primera División to Independiente. In July 2018, Bruera was signed by Chacarita Juniors of Primera B Nacional. He had almost signed with Gimnasia y Esgrima, but the move fell through after derogatory comments Bruera made about the club on Twitter whilst with rivals Estudiantes. Having been an unused substitute fourteen times in 2018–19, his bow came in March 2019 against Nueva Chicago.

After making five further appearances for Chacarita in 2018–19, the goalkeeper didn't appear competitively in 2019–20. August 2020 saw Bruera join Villa Dálmine. In January 2022, Bruera moved to Estudiantes de Buenos Aires.

International career
Bruera had experience at U20 level with Argentina. He was a part of their squad for the 2016 L'Alcúdia International Tournament in Spain; where they finished as runners-up.

Personal life
Bruera is the nephew of former La Plata mayor Pablo Bruera.

Career statistics
.

References

External links

1997 births
Living people
Footballers from La Plata
Argentine footballers
Association football goalkeepers
Primera Nacional players
Estudiantes de La Plata footballers
Club Atlético Independiente footballers
Chacarita Juniors footballers
Estudiantes de Buenos Aires footballers
Villa Dálmine footballers